The Fairfield Echo was a weekly broadsheet newspaper founded in Fairfield, Ohio. It was owned by Cox Enterprises until the company ceased publication of the Echo in January, 2013. The paper covered Fairfield and Fairfield Township in Butler County.
The Echo was established on September 7, 1956, nearly a year after Fairfield became a city (October 1955).

References

External links

 Fairfield Echo
 Official mobile website

Defunct newspapers published in Ohio
Cox Newspapers
Fairfield, Ohio
Weekly newspapers published in the United States